Nattawut "Baz" Poonpiriya (born 1981) is a Thai director, working extensively on television commercials and music videos, but best known for the films Countdown, Bad Genius and One for the Road.

Biography
Nattawut graduated Master of Fine Arts in stage directing from Srinakharinwirot University. After graduating, he worked mainly on television commercials for three years before moving to New York to study graphic design at Pratt Institute. He returned to Thailand in 2011, and worked as a music video director before directing his first feature film, the horror thriller Countdown, for GTH in 2012. The film won three categories at the Suphannahong National Film Awards. Nattawut then made a hiatus from feature films to focus again on advertising. His second feature, Bad Genius, was released in 2017, and won a record-breaking twelve categories at the awards.

Filmography

Feature films
Countdown (2012)
Bad Genius (2017)
One for the Road (2022)

Short films
The Library (2013)
Present Perfect (2014)
i Stories 'L''' (2018), co-directed with Khamkwan Duangmanee

Awards and honors
22nd Suphannahong National Film Award for Best Screenplay (for Countdown, 2012)
27th Suphannahong National Film Award for Best Director (for Bad Genius, 2017)
27th Suphannahong National Film Award for Best Screenplay (with Tanida Hantaweewatana and Vasudhorn Piyaromna, for Bad Genius, 2017)
26th Bangkok Critics Assembly Award for Best Director (for Bad Genius, 2017)
26th Bangkok Critics Assembly Award for Best Screenplay (with Tanida Hantaweewatana and Vasudhorn Piyaromna, for Bad Genius'', 2017)

References

Further reading

Nattawut Poonpiriya
Nattawut Poonpiriya
1981 births
Living people